Shorna-Kay Richards is a Jamaican career diplomat currently serving as Jamaica ambassador to Japan. She previously served as the Director of the Bilateral Relations in the Ministry of Foreign Affairs and Deputy Permanent Representative of Jamaica to the United Nations in New York and served as Vice-Chair of the UN Disarmament Commission.

Education 
Richards had her secondary education at Bishop Gibson and Hampton High Schools for girls before proceeding to the University of West Indies where she received a bachelor of arts degree and a master’s degree in International Policy and Practice from the Elliot School of International Affairs, George Washington University, USA.

Career 
She began her career at the Ministry of Foreign Affairs and Foreign Trade in September 1994 and rose through the ranks to Deputy Permanent Representative of Jamaica to the United Nations in New York and served as Jamaican representative to the Organization of American States, OAS in Washington, DC and later transferred to Jamaican High Commission in Pretoria, South Africa. After ending her mission in South Africa, she returned home and was appointed Director of the Bilateral Relations in the Ministry of Foreign Affairs and served in this position until her appointment in 2020, as Ambassador to Japan and accredited to other Asian countries.

References 

Jamaican diplomats
University of the West Indies alumni
George Washington University alumni
Jamaican women diplomats
Year of birth missing (living people)
Living people
Jamaican officials of the United Nations
Ambassadors of Jamaica to Japan